Kynosargous, up until 1908 known as Dourgouti, is a small neighborhood of Athens, Greece.

It is named after the Cynosarges which is thought to have been in the area in antiquity.

It is served by Syngrou–Fix station on Line 2 of the Athens Metro.

Notes

References

Neighbourhoods in Athens